= A Story Told =

American rock band

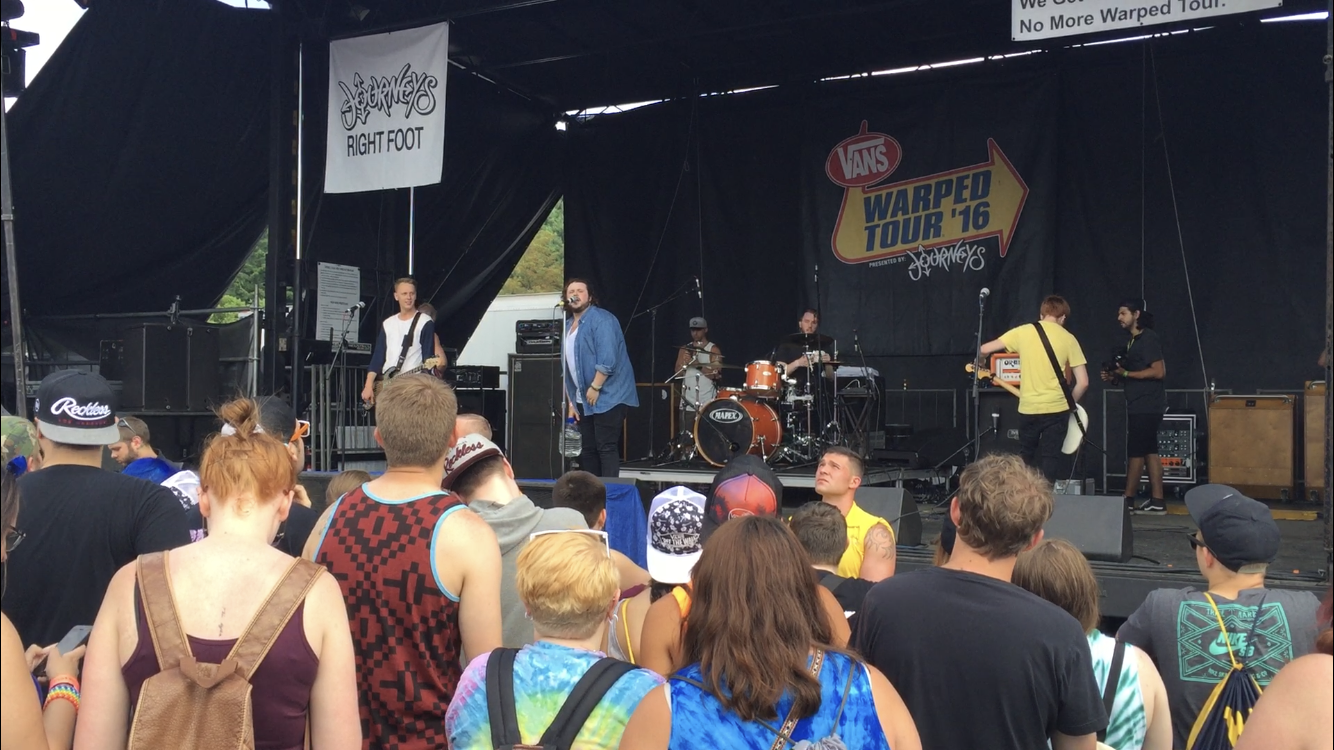
- A Story Told performing at the Vans Warped Tour in Pittsburgh, PA on July 15, 2016.

Background information
- Origin: Charleston, West Virginia
- Genres: Pop rock; electronic rock; indie rock; indie pop
- Years active: 2013 - present
- Members: Alex Chaney; Josh Allen; Jason Lieser
- Website: astorytoldband.com

A Story Told is an American rock band from Charleston, West Virginia, formed in 2013. Consisting of lead vocalist Alex Chaney and guitarists Josh Allen and Jason Lieser, the band defines themselves as “emotionally forward pop rock”. Their sound has been influenced by acts such as blink-182, OneRepublic, and Taylor Swift. They released their debut full-length album Keep Watch in March 2016. In October 2017, they released another full-length entitled Good Looks, and followed with American Made in 2021 and Mundane Magic in 2023.

== Band Members ==
- Alex Chaney - vocals, keys
- Josh Allen - guitar
- Jason Lieser - guitar

== Discography ==
LPs

- Keep Watch (2016)
- Good Looks (2017)
- American Made (2021)
- Mundane Magic (2023)

EPs

- What Got Me Here In The First Place (2014)
- Fall Back (2013)
